The Department of National Parks and Wildlife Conservation is a government agency of Nepal and one of five departments of the Ministry of Forests and Soil Conservation. It is assigned with the responsibilities of conserving the wildlife of Nepal. It is furthermore responsible for managing the protected areas of Nepal, including national parks and conservation areas. The department is also part of the REDD+ Group.

Duties
Additional to conserving flora and fauna in Nepal and managing national parks, the Department of National Parks and Wild Life Conservation also supports people living within the boundaries of those parks as well as their buffer zones and promotes ecotourism.
The department also carries out surveys including annual censuses of endangered species, such as the Bengal tiger.
Furthermore, the department creates revenue from film shooting in national parks and conservation areas.

Gallery

References

Government departments of Nepal
National park administrators
1980 establishments in Nepal
Environmental agencies in Nepal